The 1928 Oglethorpe Stormy Petrels football team represented Oglethorpe University in the sport of American football as member of the Southern Intercollegiate Athletic Association (SIAA) during the 1928 college football season. The 1928 season was highly anticipated. The Petrels were expected to do very well. However, the only game that was considered a true success was Oglethorpe's victory of her rival, Mercer.

Schedule

References

Oglethorpe
Oglethorpe Stormy Petrels football seasons
Oglethorpe Stormy Petrels football